Newport Cricket Club (NCC) is a cricket club based in the city of Newport, South Wales. The club runs 1st, 2nd, 3rd and 4th XIs in the SWALEC Premier Cricket League and Glamorgan and Monmouthshire League.
The club fields eight youth teams in the Under 11, Under 13, Under 15 and Under 17 age groups as well as the Newport Girls team who compete in the Monmouthshire Building Society Youth Cricket League.

Newport Cricket Club was based at Rodney Parade in Newport city centre until the land was sold and the new Maindee primary school was built on the site. The club relocated to its current location at Newport International Sports Village.

References

External links 
 Newport Cricket Club

Sport in Newport, Wales
Welsh club cricket teams
1834 establishments in Wales